Edgars Skuja (born 20 February 1966, in Valmiera)  is a Latvian diplomat and is the current Ambassador of Latvia to Austria, and former Ambassador of Latvia to Russia presenting his credentials to Russian President Dmitry Medvedev on 29 May 2009. He currently resides in Austria and has two daughters: Keita, who is currently in the IB Program and Sanda Skuja, who works in the Latvian beer company Aldaris Brewery.

References

Living people
1966 births
People from Valmiera
Ambassadors of Latvia to Russia
Recipients of the Order of the Cross of Terra Mariana, 1st Class
Permanent Representatives of Latvia to NATO